Eddy Ottoz (born 3 June 1944) is an Italian former athlete and bronze medalist at the 1968 Summer Olympics in the 110 metre hurdles.

Biography

Sport career
Ottoz competed for Italy in the 1964 Summer Olympics held in Tokyo, Japan, and in the 1968 Summer Olympics held in Mexico City, Mexico where he won the bronze medal in the 110 metre hurdles event.

In retirement
Ottoz retired from competitions in 1969, aged 25. He became an athletics coach in 1986, and by 1992 trained hurdlers and sprinters of the Italy national athletics team. As a sports manager he was president of the Regional Committee of the CONI of the Valle d'Aosta. Since 2001 he has been a member of the national board of the same Olympic Committee and chair of the Regional Committee FIDAL of Valle d'Aosta.

National records
 110 metres hurdles: 13.46 ( Mexico City, 17 October 1968) – held until 30 August 1994 when it was broken by his son Laurent with 13.42 seconds.

Progression
Ottoz was in the top 25 world year list for six consecutive seasons.

Achievements

National titles
5 wins in 110 metres hurdles at the Italian Athletics Championships (1965, 1966, 1967, 1968, 1969)

See also
 Italian all-time lists – 110 metres hurdles
 Italy national athletics team – Multiple medalists
 Ottoz family
 FIDAL Hall of Fame

References

External links

 
 
 

1944 births
Living people
Sportspeople from Alpes-Maritimes
Italian male hurdlers
Italian athletics coaches
Athletes (track and field) at the 1964 Summer Olympics
Athletes (track and field) at the 1968 Summer Olympics
Olympic athletes of Italy
Olympic bronze medalists for Italy
European Athletics Championships medalists
Medalists at the 1968 Summer Olympics
Olympic bronze medalists in athletics (track and field)
Universiade medalists in athletics (track and field)
Universiade gold medalists for Italy
Medalists at the 1965 Summer Universiade
Medalists at the 1967 Summer Universiade
Sportspeople from Aosta Valley